The Women's high jump event  at the 2009 European Athletics Indoor Championships was held on March 7–8.

Medalists

Results

Qualification
Qualification Performance: 1.94 (Q) or at least 8 best performers advanced to the final.

Final

References
Results

High jump at the European Athletics Indoor Championships
2009 European Athletics Indoor Championships
2009 in women's athletics